Rapid Creek is a stream in Johnson County, Iowa, in the United States. It is a tributary of the Iowa River.

Rapid Creek was so named on account of its fast-moving waters.

See also
List of rivers of Iowa

References

Rivers of Johnson County, Iowa
Rivers of Iowa